Im Ha-na (born 1 January 2000) is a South Korean sport shooter.

She participated at the 2018 ISSF World Shooting Championships.

References

External links

Living people
2000 births
South Korean female sport shooters
ISSF rifle shooters
Sportspeople from Gangwon Province, South Korea
21st-century South Korean women